Amrita （アムリタ) is a novel written by Japanese author Banana Yoshimoto (吉本ばなな）in 1994 and translated into English in 1997 by Russell F. Wasden.

Plot synopsis
The main character, Sakumi, loses her beautiful younger sister, an actress, to suicide. Sakumi subsequently falls down a flight of stairs, losing her memory. She struggles to regain her memory with the assistance of her sister's lover and a clairvoyant kid brother.

Awards
 5th Murasaki Shikibu Prize – November, 1995
 Scanno (Italy) – June, 1993
 Fendissime (Italy) – March, 1996
 Maschera d'Argento (Italy)– November, 1999

Book information 
Amrita (English edition) by Banana Yoshimoto
Hardcover -  published by Grove Press, 1997
Paperback - , published by Washington Square Press, 1998

References

1994 Japanese novels
Novels by Banana Yoshimoto
Northern Mariana Islands culture
Grove Press books